Javier Espinosa González (born 19 September 1992) is a Spanish professional footballer who plays for Cypriot club AEK Larnaca FC as a central midfielder.

Club career

Barcelona B

Born in Talavera de la Reina, Toledo, Castile-La Mancha, Espinosa moved to FC Barcelona's youth system, La Masia, at the age of 13. On 1 May 2010, whilst still a junior, he made his senior debut with the B team, playing the second half in a 2–1 home win against Valencia CF Mestalla in the Segunda División B. On 26 February of the following year, after replacing fellow youth graduate Albert Dalmau, he contributed one goal to a 6–4 Segunda División away victory over CD Numancia.

Espinosa became a regular fixture under new manager Eusebio Sacristán. He scored five times in 27 games in the 2012–13 season, again spent in the second tier, and continued to appear regularly the following campaign, netting a career-best seven goals as Barça B finished third.

Villarreal
On 11 July 2014, Espinosa signed a three-year contract with Villarreal CF. He made his debut in La Liga on 24 August, replacing Cani in the 63rd minute of a 2–0 away defeat of Levante UD.

Espinosa scored his first goal in the top flight on 21 September, his team's first in a 4–2 home win over Rayo Vallecano. On 9 January 2015, he was loaned to fellow league side UD Almería until June.

On 28 August 2015, Espinosa joined Elche CF of the second division, in a season-long loan deal.

Levante
On 19 July 2016, after cutting ties with Villarreal, Espinosa signed a two-year deal with Levante, recently relegated to division two. After helping achieve promotion at the first attempt, he extended his link until 2019 and was immediately loaned to Granada CF for one year.

Espinosa terminated his contract with the Valencian club on 30 August 2018.

Twente
On 31 August 2018, Espinosa moved abroad for the first time in his career, signing for FC Twente. He made his debut in the Dutch Eerste Divisie on 8 September, starting in a 1–2 home loss against TOP Oss.

Later career
On 1 February 2021, after nearly a year of inactivity, Espinosa signed a short-term deal with CF Fuenlabrada back in his country's second tier. In the ensuing summer, he agreed to a two-year contract at AEK Larnaca FC of the Cypriot First Division.

Club statistics

Honours
Levante
Segunda División: 2016–17

Twente
Eerste Divisie: 2018–19

Spain U17
FIFA U-17 World Cup third place: 2009

References

External links

1992 births
Living people
People from Talavera de la Reina
Sportspeople from the Province of Toledo
Spanish footballers
Footballers from Castilla–La Mancha
Association football midfielders
La Liga players
Segunda División players
Segunda División B players
FC Barcelona Atlètic players
Villarreal CF players
UD Almería players
Elche CF players
Levante UD footballers
Granada CF footballers
CF Fuenlabrada footballers
Eredivisie players
Eerste Divisie players
FC Twente players
Cypriot First Division players
AEK Larnaca FC players
Spain youth international footballers
Spanish expatriate footballers
Expatriate footballers in the Netherlands
Expatriate footballers in Cyprus
Spanish expatriate sportspeople in the Netherlands
Spanish expatriate sportspeople in Cyprus